Wesley Moodie and Todd Perry were the defending champions, but chose not to participate that year.

Máximo González and Juan Mónaco won in the final 7–5, 7–5, against Travis Parrott and Filip Polášek.

Seeds

Draw

Draw

External links
Association of Tennis Professionals (ATP) – doubles draw

Doubles